Divinity or the divine are things that are either related to, devoted to, or proceeding from a deity. What is or is not divine may be loosely defined, as it is used by different belief systems.

Etymology

The root of the word divine is literally "godly", but the use varies significantly depending on which deity is being discussed.

Usages

Divinity as a quality has two distinct usages:
Divine force or power - Powers or forces that are universal, or transcend human capacities
Divinity applied to mortals - Qualities of individuals who are considered to have some special access or relationship to the divine.

Overlap occurs between these usages because deities or godly entities are often identical with or identified by the powers and forces that are credited to them — in many cases, a deity is merely a power or force personified — and these powers and forces may then be extended or granted to mortal individuals. For instance, Jehovah is closely associated with storms and thunder throughout much of the Old Testament. He is said to speak in thunder, and thunder is seen as a token of his anger. This power was then extended to prophets like Moses and Samuel, who caused thunderous storms to rain down on their enemies. Divinity always carries connotations of goodness, beauty, beneficence, justice, and other positive, pro-social attributes. In monotheistic faiths there is an equivalent cohort of malefic supernatural beings and powers, such as demons, devils, afreet, etc., which are not conventionally referred to as divine; demonic is often used instead. Pantheistic and polytheistic faiths make no such distinction; gods and other beings of transcendent power often have complex, ignoble, or even irrational motivations for their acts. Note that while the terms demon and demonic are used in monotheistic faiths as antonyms to divine, they are in fact derived from the Greek word daimón (δαίμων), which itself translates as divinity.

Uses in religious discourse
There are three distinct usages of divinity and divine in religious discourse:

Entity

In monotheistic faiths, the word divinity is often used to refer to the singular God central to that faith. Often the word takes the definite article and is capitalized — "the Divinity" — as though it were a proper name or definitive honorific. 
Divine — capitalized — may be used as an adjective to refer to the manifestations of such a Divinity or its powers: e.g. "basking in the Divine presence..."

The terms divinity and divine — uncapitalized, and lacking the definite article — are sometimes used to denote 'god(s) or certain other beings and entities which fall short of absolute Godhood but lie outside the human realm.

Divine force or power
As previously noted, divinities are closely related to the transcendent force(s) or power(s) credited to them, so much so that in some cases the powers or forces may themselves be invoked independently. This leads to the second usage of the word divine (and less common usage of divinity): to refer to the operation of transcendent power in the world.

In its most direct form, the operation of transcendent power implies some form of divine intervention. For pan- and polytheistic faiths this usually implies the direct action of one god or another on the course of human events. In Greek legend, for instance, it was Poseidon (god of the sea) who raised the storms that blew Odysseus's craft off course on his return journey, and Japanese tradition holds that a god-sent wind saved them from Mongol invasion. Prayers or propitiations are often offered to specific gods of pantheisms to garner favorable interventions in particular enterprises: e.g. safe journeys, success in war, or a season of bountiful crops. Many faiths around the world — from Japanese Shinto and Chinese traditional religion, to certain African practices and the faiths derived from those in the Caribbean, to Native American beliefs — hold that ancestral or household deities offer daily protection and blessings. In monotheistic religions, divine intervention may take very direct forms: miracles, visions, or intercessions by blessed figures.

Transcendent force or power may also operate through more subtle and indirect paths. Monotheistic faiths generally support some version of divine providence, which acknowledges that the divinity of the faith has a profound but unknowable plan always unfolding in the world. Unforeseeable, overwhelming, or seemingly unjust events are often thrown on 'the will of the Divine', in deferences like the Muslim inshallah ('as God wills it') and Christian 'God works in mysterious ways'. Often such faiths hold out the possibility of divine retribution as well, where the divinity will unexpectedly bring evil-doers to justice through the conventional workings of the world; from the subtle redressing of minor personal wrongs to such large-scale havoc as the destruction of Sodom and Gomorrah or the biblical Great Flood. Other faiths are even more subtle: the doctrine of karma shared by Buddhism and Hinduism is a divine law similar to divine retribution but without the connotation of punishment: our acts, good or bad, intentional or unintentional, reflect back on us as part of the natural working of the universe. Philosophical Taoism also proposes a transcendent operant principle — transliterated in English as tao or dao, meaning 'the way' — which is neither an entity nor a being per se, but reflects the natural ongoing process of the world. Modern western mysticism and new age philosophy often use the term 'the Divine' as a noun in this latter sense: a non-specific principle or being that gives rise to the world, and acts as the source or wellspring of life. In these latter cases, the faiths do not promote deference, as happens in monotheisms; rather each suggests a path of action that will bring the practitioner into conformance with the divine law: ahimsa — 'no harm' — for Buddhist and Hindu faiths; de or te — 'virtuous action' — in Taoism; and any of numerous practices of peace and love in new age thinking.

Mortal

In the third usage, extensions of divinity and divine power are credited to living, mortal individuals. Political leaders are known to have claimed actual divinity in certain early societies — the ancient Egyptian Pharaohs being the premier case — taking a role as objects of worship and being credited with superhuman status and powers. More commonly, and more pertinent to recent history, leaders merely claim some form of divine mandate, suggesting that their rule is in accordance with the will of God. The doctrine of the divine right of kings was introduced as late as the 17th century, proposing that kings rule by divine decree; Japanese Emperors ruled by divine mandate until the inception of the Japanese constitution after World War II.

Less politically, most faiths have any number of people that are believed to have been touched by divine forces: saints, prophets, heroes, oracles, martyrs, and enlightened beings, among others. Saint Francis of Assisi, in Catholicism, is said to have received instruction directly from God and it is believed that he grants plenary indulgence to all who confess their sins and visit his chapel on the appropriate day. In Greek mythology, Achilles' mother bathed him in the river Styx to give him immortality, and Hercules — as the son of Zeus — inherited near-godly powers. In religious Taoism, Lao Tsu is venerated as a saint with his own powers. Various individuals in the Buddhist faith, beginning with Siddhartha, are considered to be enlightened, and in religious forms of Buddhism they are credited with divine powers. Christ in the Bible is said to be God's Son and is said to have performed divine miracles.

In general, mortals with divine qualities are carefully distinguished from the deity or deities in their religion's main pantheon. Even the Christian faith, which generally holds Christ to be identical to God, distinguishes between God the Father and Christ the begotten Son. There are, however, certain esoteric and mystical schools of thought, present in many faiths — Sufis in Islam, Gnostics in Christianity, Advaitan Hindus, Zen Buddhists, as well as several non-specific perspectives developed in new age philosophy — which hold that all humans are in essence divine, or unified with the Divine in a non-trivial way. Such divinity, in these faiths, would express itself naturally if it were not obscured by the social and physical worlds we live in; it needs to be brought to the fore through appropriate spiritual practices.

Christianity
In the New Testament the Greek word θεῖον (theion) in the Douay Version, is translated as "divinity". Examples are below:
Acts 17:29
"Being therefore the offspring of God, we must not suppose the divinity to be like unto gold, or silver, or stone, the graving of art, and device of man."
Romans 1:20
"For the invisible things of him, from the creation of the world, are clearly seen, being understood by the things that are made; his eternal power also, and divinity: so that they are inexcusable."
Revelation 5:12
"Saying with a loud voice: The Lamb that was slain is worthy to receive power, and divinity, and wisdom, and strength, and honour, and glory, and benediction."

The word translated as either "deity", "Godhead", or "divinity" in the Greek New Testament is also the Greek word θεότητος (theotētos), and the one verse that contains it is this:
Colossians 2:9
"Quia in ipso inhabitat omnis plenitudo divinitatis [divinity] corporaliter." (Vulgate)
"For in him dwelleth all the fulness of the Godhead bodily." (KJV)
"Because it is in him that all the fullness of the divine quality dwells bodily." (NWT)
"For in him all the fullness of deity lives in bodily form." (NET)
"For the full content of divine nature lives in Christ." (TEV)

The word "divine" in the New Testament is the Greek word θείας (theias), and is the adjective form of "divinity". Biblical examples from the King James Bible are below:
2 Peter 1:3
"According as his divine power hath given unto us all things that pertain unto life and godliness, through the knowledge of him that hath called us to glory and virtue."
2 Peter 1:4
"Whereby are given unto us exceeding great and precious promises: that by these ye might be partakers of the divine nature, having escaped the corruption that is in the world through lust."

Latter-day Saints

The most prominent conception of divine entities in the Church of Jesus Christ of Latter-day Saints (LDS Church) is the Godhead, a divine council of three distinct beings: Elohim (the Father), Jehovah (the Son, or Jesus), and the Holy Spirit. Joseph Smith described a nontrinitarian Godhead, with God the Father and Jesus Christ each having individual physical bodies, and the Holy Spirit as a distinct personage with a spirit body. Smith also introduced the existence of a Heavenly Mother in the King Follett Discourse, but very little is acknowledged or known beyond her existence.

Mormons hold a belief in the divine potential of humanity; Smith taught a form of divinization where mortal men and women can become like god through salvation and exaltation. Lorenzo Snow succinctly summarized this using a couplet, which is often repeated within the LDS Church: "As man now is, God once was: As God now is, man may be."

Epicureanism

Epicurean philosophy admits the existence of gods, but since it does not accept the supernatural and teaches that all things are material, posits a theology where the Epicurean gods are physical beings whose bodies are made of atoms and who live in the region between the words (intermundia). Needless to say, these gods do not need our worship, are not creators or maintainers of the cosmos, nor do they answer prayers. Therefore, Epicurean theology belongs properly in the realm of speculation about super-evolved, intelligent extraterrestrial life.

However, Epicurus of Samos (the founder of the School) recognized the utility of religiosity and its central, unifying symbols. He was adamant in his requirement that his disciples be pious, and established two taboos concerning their conception of the gods: they had to believe that their gods were immortal (that is, indestructible and fully self-sufficient) and blessed (happy, or blissful). Outside of that, Epicureans are free to speculate concerning the nature of the highest life forms in the cosmos.

See also
Apotheosis
Christology
Deity
Divinization (Christian)
Ho'oponopono (Morrnah section)
List of deities
Sacred

References

External links

Conceptions of God
Religious belief and doctrine
Philosophy of religion
Deities